An election to Letterkenny Town Council took place in 1994. 9 councillors were elected by PR-STV voting for a five-year term of office.

Results by party

Members
Based on this.
 P. J. Blake, Independent
 Jean Crossan, Fianna Fáil
 Tadhg Culbert, Fianna Fáil
 Jimmy Harte, Fine Gael
 Victor Fisher, Fianna Fáil
 Dessie Larkin, Independent Fianna Fáil
 Jim Lynch, Independent
 Seán Maloney, Labour
 ?

External links
 Letterkenny Town Council election, 1994 at electionsireland.org

Letterkenny
Politics of Letterkenny